The Schuylkill Canal, or Schuylkill Navigation, was a system of interconnected canals and slack-water pools along the Schuylkill River in the U.S. state of Pennsylvania, built as a commercial waterway in the early 19th-century. Chartered in 1815, the navigation opened in 1825 to provide transportation and water power. At the time, the river was the least expensive and most efficient method of transporting bulk cargo, and the eastern seaboard cities of the U.S. were experiencing an energy crisis due to deforestation. It fostered the mining of anthracite coal as the major source of industry between Pottsville and eastern markets. Along the tow-paths, mules pulled barges of coal from Port Carbon through the water gaps to Pottsville; locally to the port and markets of Philadelphia; and some then by ship or through additional New Jersey waterways, to New York City markets.

The Schuylkill Canal was in operation until 1931 and was almost completely filled in the 1950s.  Some remaining watered reaches are now used for recreation.

History 
 

 
The Schuylkill Navigation Company was incorporated in 1815. An application for a charter to improve the Lehigh also was filed that year. These represented the growing impetus in the United States to develop a water transportation network similar to that emerging in Great Britain. 

The lower Lehigh Canal project made its first test shipments of coal in 1819, proving the Lehigh's locks concept. Its delivery in 1820 of over 365 tons of Anthracite to Philadelphia resulted in a temporary market glut. These and regularly increasing tonnages shipped down to Philadelphia's docks over the next 2–3 years attracted investors and speculators from all along the Eastern Seaboard to capitalize and fund similar companies.  This began a deluge of private canal and canal resumption projects in the 1820s. The Delaware and Hudson Canal companies, the Delaware and Raritan Canal, the Morris Canal, the Chesapeake & Delaware Canal and various others followed, triggering the North American Canal Age and helping fuel the Industrial Revolution in America.

Founding

As related in The Delaware and Lehigh Canals history, two of the principle investors in the Schuylkill Navigation Company were partner industrialists and mill owners White and Hazard, who were anxious to secure a reliable source of fuel for their mills.  Early on in the board meetings of the new corporation they'd quarreled with others over the funding, timings, and tasks necessary and when they could not prevail to speed the project, immediately explored the option of making a navigation on the Lehigh River and acquiring the mining rights of the failing Lehigh Coal Mine Company and other investors to fund the projects. The Lehigh and Schuylkill canals had similar problems, both had to make navigable a series of rapids with rivers providing less water than was optimal—and ironically, by the 1820s, both eventually shipped coal from the opposite ends of the Little Schuylkill River's tributary, and the coal deposits once owned by Lehigh Coal Mine Company (the LCMC), in the Panther Creek Valley.

When the engineering challenges and finances allowed, the Schuylkill Canal began operations in 1825. This was similar in degree to the gradients of the Lehigh Canal but twice the height drop in twice the distance, both much steeper than the Erie Canals leisurely descents. In point of fact, canals in the United States rarely kept their original configurations and improvements continued over their life; if for no other reason, periodically ice damage and freshets occur pointing out shortcomings, leading to improvements. 
 
By the early 1820s, the coal coming down the Lehigh and Schuylkill canals having alleviated the high costs of heating, overcoming in just a few years the long suffered shortages of fuels in Eastern cities and towns
The Auburn Tunnel, a 450-foot (137 m) bore through a hill near Auburn, was completed in 1821, but by 1857, due to increased traffic, canal capacity (widening) modifications turned it into an open-cut.<ref
 name="ACS">
</ref>  Like the later Delaware Canal was to the Lehigh, the Union Canal, built between 1821 and 1828, was purpose designed to connect the Susquehanna River with the Schuylkill Canal at Reading. When completed, the two canals combined to make a water link between Philadelphia and the slack water level of the Susquehanna River at Middletown. This route along the Schuylkill Valley was envisioned primarily as a coal road, whilst the Union Canal was engineered for cross-state passenger and cargoes; but it also competed with and then became secondary to the east–west divisions of the Pennsylvania Canal System on the Main Line of Public Works between Philadelphia, Harrisburg, and Pittsburgh. The Schuylkill Canal also featured the first transportation tunnel in America.

By transporting bulk cargoes and provide water power, the Schuylkill Navigation transformed the towns of Reading, Norristown, and Pottsville into early manufacturing centers. By using the Delaware River and the Delaware and Raritan and Morris Canals, manufactured products and anthracite from the Schuylkill Valley could also reach New York Harbor. The Schuylkill Navigation system quickly assumed a monopoly position in the transportation of anthracite coal from the coal mines of Schuylkill County to Philadelphia, and by 1841, was annually transporting over 737,517 tons of cargo.

Competition with the railroad 
In 1841, the Philadelphia and Reading Railroad opened, and within four years, was hauling three times as much anthracite to Philadelphia each year as the Schuylkill Navigation.  In response, the Schuylkill Navigation Company enlarged its canals; by 1847, they could accommodate the passage of boats carrying 230 tons of coal.  These barges were better than twice the size that could be used on the rival Lehigh and Delaware Canals with the latter's limited lock lengths; an artifact of having a state run a practical construction project without businessmens balancing viewpoints.  In 1850, a price-fixing arrangement with the railroad stabilized prices for the transportation of anthracite.  This decade was the Schuylkill Navigation's most prosperous period; in 1859, its peak year, it transported 1,700,000 tons of cargo.  However, in that same year the Philadelphia and Reading Railroad carried over 2,500,000 tons, an amount comparable to the Lehigh Canal's 1855 peak of 2,300,000 tons of coal.

During the 1860s the railroads had become the king of transportation with their improved power and speed of travel, so like most North American canals, the Schuylkill Canal began to decline in use for general freight and the wealthier westward bound passengers had long since used the Philadelphia and Columbia Railroad to reach the Pennsylvania Canal System to cross the Alleghenies. In 1857, the Pennsylvania Railroad had connected Pittsburgh and Philadelphia, would eventually add New York City and Chicago, and was instrumental in the declining fortunes of Pennsylvania's far flung network of canals. Railroads could reach mine heads and coal breakers where no stream existed to support the costly digging of a new ditch. Coal shifted away from canals to the more flexible means of bulk goods transportation. Where the established canals supplied, their markets mostly remained relatively stable and they generally remained competitive with only a gradual erosion of market share as decades passed. Eventually, Oil heat and their perennial problems of delivering in winter's cold diminished their role. The self-examination during the early years of the Great Depression would end up closing most, as it did the Schuylkill Navigation Company.

Decline 
In 1869 the Schuylkill Navigation was damaged by a flood, hindering operations for some time whilst repairs could be made.  In 1870, its board of directors forced by stockholders, the Schuylkill Navigation Company leased its waterway to the Philadelphia and Reading Railroad for 999 years, surrendering to the competition. Under the railroad's control, the Schuylkill Navigation continued to decline as a general freight carrier, but operated primarily as a coal road, like the Lehigh and Delaware Canals into the 1930s, since for heating and especially, steam power, nearly everyone needed anthracite. The traffic on the canal was expedited by corporate maneuvers when its New York City and New Jersey markets connecting Delaware and Raritan Canal was acquired in 1872 by the competing Pennsylvania Railroad—in a blatant act supporting a bid for monopoly, soon Schuylkill boats were denied access to this important New Jersey waterway. As a result, traffic on the Schuylkill decreased rapidly. Adding insult to injury, the PRR itself invaded the Schuylkill's territory with the construction of its Schuylkill Branch in the mid-1880s.
 
By 1890 only 144,994 tons of cargo passed through the Schuylkill Navigation. The Schuylkill Navigation was also hindered by coal silt deposits that made its upper sections almost unusable. By 1891 the portion of Navigation above Port Clinton was abandoned. By 1904 the anthracite traffic had almost completely ceased, and after 1913 only an occasional cargo passed between Port Clinton and Philadelphia. Excursion vessels and pleasure boating remained active on the Schuylkill Navigation until most of the canals were filled by the Commonwealth of Pennsylvania during 1947–1979 in efforts to remove coal silt from the Schuylkill River.

Chester County Canal 
The Chester County Canal, also known as the Phoenixville Branch Canal, was an addition to the Navigation built by the Schuylkill Navigation Company in 1828 to provide water power to a new nail works in Phoenixville.  The new canal connected the slackwater pool of the Schuylkill Canal above the Black Rock Dam to Phoenixville.  This canal paralleled the top end of the Oakes Reach, on the opposite side or the river.  While the Chester County Canal was initially built to provide water power to the mill, in 1847 it carried scheduled passenger service between Phoenixville and Norristown.  The spring freshet of 1869 destroyed the mill "and very much injured the canal and its locks."

Today
While many of the dams still stand, few watered stretches of the canal remain. Ruins and remnants of the canals structure are still visible along its length. Many of the locks chambers still exist but are buried to varying degrees. Some of the locktender's houses still exist. Even if filled in, the canal's presence in many river communities is remembered by several Canal Streets.

Leesport has a restored Locktender's house on E. Wall Street.  The  adjacent lock had long been filled with a car wash located on the site, but in 2011, the lock car wash was removed, and the lock unearthed.  Near Gibraltar, the Allegheny Creek Aqueduct still exists along with a drained section of the canal prism.  The Aqueduct is on the National Register of Historic Places.

Oakes Reach 

 
The head of the Oakes Reach is at the Black Rock Dam (Dam #26), near Mont Clare.  The canal passes through the dam structure at Lock #60.  The volunteer Schuylkill Canal Association has restored Lock 60 to operating condition.

The nearby locktender's house has also been restored.  The Reach runs under Pennsylvania Route 29 in Mont Clare, directly across the river from Phoenixville, then through Port Providence.  An impounding basin from the silt removal project cuts the canal after Longford Road and the final mile of the Reach, has been filled in.  An old stone aqueduct, that carried the Canal over Crossman's Run, and the outlet lock tender's house are still existent; but Lock 61, Brower's Lock, was filled in.

This reach is named for Thomas Oakes, chief engineer of the Schuylkill Navigation Company. The Oakes Reach canal, locks, locktenders' houses, Black Rock Dam, and the slackwater pool extending up to the Pennsylvania Route 113 bridge form the "Schuylkill Navigation Canal, Oakes Reach Section" historic district.

On December 30, 2017 what is thought to be the non-mechanized, human powered speed record was set on the Oakes Reach by Todd Martin, originally of Mont Clare. The record of 19 minutes 38 seconds, was set on ice skates from the existing waste water control valve structure at the lower end to the Lock 60 Lower Lock Head Wall. The distance traveled for the record is 2.33 miles. 3" of snow was present on the ice, temp 14 F, head wind approximately 10–15 mph.

 Lock 60 
 Present end of reach 
 Lock 61 Tender's House

Manayunk Reach 
The head of the Manayunk Reach is at the Flat Rock Dam (Dam 31), near Shawmont.  The canal originally passed through the dam structure at Lock 68.  However Lock 68 is plated off, and the forereach area above has silted in.  

  
This stretch of canal forms the northern side of Venice Island, which is facing development pressures.  At the downstream end of this reach, the canal runs through Manayunk and returns to the river via Locks 69 & 70.  All three lock structures still exist.

 Lock 68 
 Locks 69&70

Schuylkill River Trail 
The Schuylkill River Trail (SRT) now overlays portions of the canal route.  In Manayunk, the Trail was constructed across the canal from the towpath.  (The Reading railroad built a freight spur on the canal towpath.) 
In 2008 the  extension of the Schuylkill River Trail from the Perkiomen Creek to Longford Road in Oaks opened.  This length of the Trail makes use of the general course of the filled portion of the Oakes Reach and originally used the old canal aqueduct to cross Crossman's Run.  On 14 February 2008, a meeting was held to announce the survey work for the extension of the Schuylkill River Trail along the towpath of the watered portion of the Oakes Reach.  It was expected that the towpath restoration itself would commence around March 2009.  Restoration of the canal towpath between Longford Road and Mont Clare is now complete.  However, this one-mile-long segment of Schuylkill River Trail is a narrow crushed-stone path, designed for pedestrians and slower bicycles. Cyclists who prefer higher speeds are encouraged to ride on parallel Walnut Street, rather than the Longford Road-to-Mont Clare section of tow-path.

See also
Allegheny Aqueduct
List of canals in the United States
 Delaware Canal – A sister canal from the mouth of the Lehigh River and canal terminus, feeding urban Philadelphia connecting with the Morris and Lehigh Canals at their respective Easton terminals.
 Delaware and Raritan Canal – A New Jersey canal connection to the New York & New Jersey markets shipping primarily coal across the Delaware River. The D&R also shipped Iron Ore from New Jersey up the Lehigh.
 Delaware and Schuylkill navigation company- 1791 private stock company that failed and was a predecessor to the 1815 Schuylkill Navigation company.
 Chesapeake and Delaware Canal – A canal crossing the Delmarva Peninsula in the states of Delaware and Maryland, connecting the Chesapeake Bay with the Delaware Bay.
 Delaware and Hudson Canal – Another early built coal canal as the American canal age began; contemporary with the Lehigh and the Schuylkill navigations.
 Lehigh Canal – the coal canal along the Lehigh Valley that fed the United States early Industrial revolution energy needs directly and via the Delaware Canal businesses all along the forty miles to Philadelphia from Easton, Pennsylvania.
 Morris Canal – Another important American Industrial Revolution canal feeding steel mills ores from Central New Jersey and coal to New York and New Jersey Markets.
 Pennsylvania Canal System – an ambitious collection of far-flung canals, and eventually railroads authorized early in 1826.
 Schuylkill Canal – Navigation joining Reading, PA and Philadelphia.
 Schuylkill and Susquehanna Navigation Company - 1791 predecessor private stock company that failed.
 Union canal - 1811 private stock company that completed the "golden link between the Schuylkill and Susquehanna rivers in 1828, thereby connecting the Schuylkill Navigation company with the Pennsylvania canal in Middleton.

Notes

References

External links

Schuylkill Navigation History, description and list of locks, dams, and reaches

Historical Berks county and the Schuylkill Canal
Lower Schuylkill River canal
Historical pictures of the Schuylkill Canal
Schuylkill Navigation Collection at Reading Area Community College:
Period company documents and maps
1947 Appraisal
Upper Schuylkill River canal
Friends of the Manayunk Canal – Manayunk Reach
Schuylkill Canal Association – Oak[e]s Reach
PA Historical Marker and information
[ NRHP Registration Form for Oakes Reach] – Use search form on PA ARCH site for additional image
Information and pictures of the Schuylkill Canal in Schuylkill Haven, PA

Canals on the National Register of Historic Places in Pennsylvania
Canals in Pennsylvania
Historic American Engineering Record in Pennsylvania
Ruins in the United States
Schuylkill River
Transportation buildings and structures in Chester County, Pennsylvania
Canals opened in 1827
Historic districts on the National Register of Historic Places in Pennsylvania
National Register of Historic Places in Chester County, Pennsylvania
1827 establishments in Pennsylvania
Transportation buildings and structures in Berks County, Pennsylvania
Transportation buildings and structures in Schuylkill County, Pennsylvania
Transportation buildings and structures in Montgomery County, Pennsylvania
Transportation buildings and structures in Philadelphia